The Sisterhood (released in the Philippines as Caged Women) is a 1988 American action/adventure/science fiction film directed by Filipino director Cirio H. Santiago.

Cast
Rebecca Holden
Chuck Wagner
Lynn-Holly Johnson
Barbara Patrick
Robert Dryer
Henry Strzalkowski
David Light
Jim Moss
Anthony East
Tom McNeeley

Plot
In what used to be America, several women fight to stay alive in a post-apocalyptic world, after being captured by a brutal army of men. The men are veterans of the "Western War," which occurred sometime before 2021. The army is led by Mikal (Chuck Wagner) who is world-weary and tired of fighting, but sees no alternative

With escape impossible,  their only hope for rescue is a nomadic band of fierce she-warriors: The Sisterhood. Each member of the Sisterhood has a unique paranormal power, although they have lost battles to the men's forces in the past. Led by Alee (Rebecca Holden) the Sisterhood eschews mechanical weapons  in favor of their paranormal abilities. The Sisterhood is able to overcome the army of men and free the captives. They reaffirm their commitment to heal the land with the use of their powers not machinery.

Release
The Sisterhood was released in the United States in January 1988. In the Philippines, the film was released as Caged Women by Jadestar Films on June 30, 1989.

Reception
Creature Feature gave the movie 2 out of 5 stars. Others found the movie "trashy," although the acting is found to be better than average and the story is better than average

References

External links

1988 films
1980s action adventure films
1980s science fiction action films
American action adventure films
Films set in 2021
1980s English-language films
Films directed by Cirio H. Santiago
1980s American films